Haines Glacier is a glacier  wide, flowing in a southeasterly direction and joining Meinardus Glacier immediately east of Mount Barkow, on the east coast of Palmer Land, Antarctica. It was discovered and photographed from the air in December 1940 by the United States Antarctic Service. During 1947 the glacier was photographed from the air by the Ronne Antarctic Research Expedition, who in conjunction with the Falkland Islands Dependencies Survey (FIDS) charted it from the ground. The glacier was named by the FIDS for William C. Haines, an American meteorologist who was a member of the Byrd Antarctic Expeditions of 1928–30 and 1933–35, and was joint author of the meteorological reports of these two expeditions.

References

Glaciers of Palmer Land